Yamfo is a town in the Ahafo Region of Ghana. The town is known for the Yamfo Anglican Commercial School.  The Anglican Commercial School is a second cycle institution. Also for the Yamfo College of Health which is affiliated with the University of Cape Coast.

Gallery

References

Populated places in the Ahafo Region